Eutelsat 113 West A, formerly Satmex-6, is a geostationary communications satellite which is operated by Eutelsat. Originally built for Mexico's Satmex, it was launched in 2006. The satellite was acquired by Eutelsat in its 2014 merger with Satmex, and renamed Eutelsat 113 West A in May. It is used to provide communications services to the Americas, Hawaii and the Caribbean.

Constructed by Space Systems/Loral, Satmex 6 is based on the LS-1300X satellite bus.

Arianespace was contracted to launch Satmex 6, using an Ariane 5ECA carrier rocket flying from ELA-3 at the Guiana Space Centre. The launch occurred at 21:09 GMT on 27 May 2006, and placed Satmex 6, along with the Thaicom 5 satellite, into a geosynchronous transfer orbit. At the time, this was the heaviest dual-satellite payload ever launched to geostationary transfer orbit.

Following launch, the satellite raised its own orbit by means of an onboard apogee motor. At 18:33 GMT on 31 May, it was injected into geostationary orbit. It was subsequently tested, and positioned at a longitude of 113° West for operational service.

See also

2006 in spaceflight

References

External links
Satmex 6 at International Media Switzerland

Spacecraft launched in 2006
Satellites of Mexico
2006 in Mexico
Eutelsat satellites
Communications satellites in geostationary orbit
Ariane commercial payloads